Miller twist rule is a mathematical formula derived by Don Miller to determine the rate of twist to apply to a given bullet to provide optimum stability using a rifled barrel. Miller suggests that, while Greenhill's formula works well, there are better and more precise methods for determining the proper twist rate that are no more difficult to compute.

Formula

The following formula is one recommended by Miller:

where
 m = bullet mass in grains
 s = gyroscopic stability factor (dimensionless)
 d = bullet diameter in inches
 l = bullet length in calibers
 t = twist rate in calibers per turn

Also, since one "caliber" in this context is one bullet diameter, we have:

where  = twist rate in inches per turn, and

where  = bullet length in inches.

Stability factor
Solving Miller's formula for  gives the stability factor for a known bullet and twist rate:

Twist in inches per turn
Solving the formula for  gives the twist rate in inches per turn:

Notes
Note that the constant 30 in the formula is Miller's rough approximation of velocity (2800 ft/sec), standard temperature (59 degrees Fahrenheit) and pressure (750 mm Hg and 78% humidity). Miller states that these values are taken from the Army Standard Metro but does note that his values are slightly off. He goes on to point out that the difference should be small enough that it can be ignored.

It should also be noted that the bullet density is missing from Miller's formula despite the fact that Miller himself states his formula expands upon Greenhill's. The bullet density in the equation above is implicit in  through the moment of inertia approximation.

Finally, note that the denominator of Miller's formula is based upon the relative shape of a modern bullet. The term  roughly indicates a shape similar to that of an American football.

Safe values
When computing using this formula, Miller suggests several safe values that can be used for some of the more difficult to determine variables. For example, he states that a mach number of  = 2.5 (roughly 2800 ft/sec, assuming standard conditions at sea level where 1 Mach is roughly 1116 ft/sec) is a safe value to use for velocity. He also states that rough estimates involving temperature should use  = 2.0.

Example
Using a Nosler Spitzer bullet in a .30-06 Springfield, which is similar to the one pictured above, and substituting values for the variables, we determine the estimated optimum twist rate.

where
 m = 180 grains
 s = 2.0 (the safe value noted above)
 d = .308 inches
 l = 1.180" /.308" = 3.83 calibers

The result indicates an optimum twist rate of 39.2511937 calibers per turn. Determining  from  we have

Thus the optimum rate of twist for this bullet should be approximately 12 inches per turn. The typical twist of .30-06 caliber rifle barrels is 10 inches per turn, accommodating heavier bullets than in this example. A different twist rate often helps explain why some bullets work better in certain rifles when fired under similar conditions.

Comparison to Greenhill's formula
Greenhill's formula is much more complicated in full form. The rule of thumb that Greenhill devised based upon his formula is actually what is seen in most writing, including Wikipedia. The rule of thumb is:

The actual formula is:

where
 S = gyroscopic stability
 s = twist rate in radians per second
 m = polar moment of inertia
  = pitching moment coefficient
 a = angle of attack
 t = transverse moment of inertia
 d = air density
 v = velocity

Thus, Miller essentially took Greenhill's rule of thumb and expanded it slightly, while keeping the formula simple enough to be used by someone with basic math skills. To improve on Greenhill, Miller used mostly empirical data and basic geometry.

Corrective equations
Miller notes several corrective equations that can be used:

The velocity correction for twist: 

The velocity correction for stability factor: 

The altitude correction under standard conditions:  where  is altitude in feet.

See also
Rifling

References

External links

Calculators for stability and twist 
Bowman-Howell Twist Rate Calculator
Miller Formula Calculator
Drag/Twist Calculator based on Bob McCoy's "McGyro" algorithm

Firearm terminology